McMeel is a surname. Notable people with the surname include:

 Cortright McMeel (1971–2013), American writer
 Noel McMeel, Northern Irish chef

See also
 McKeel
 McMeen